Draw the Line, formerly Women's Desk is a Philippine television public affairs show broadcast by QTV. Hosted by Rhea Santos, it premiered on November 11, 2005 as Women's Desk. The show concluded in March 2009. It was replaced by Q-Tube in its timeslot.

Overview
It targeted cases about abuses against women, as Santos is a women's rights advocate. In August 2008, the show was retitled to Draw the Line.

2005 Philippine television series debuts
2009 Philippine television series endings
Filipino-language television shows
GMA Integrated News and Public Affairs shows
Philippine television shows
Q (TV network) original programming